Eddie Cooper (born 1987) is a British actor, best known for his portrayal of the main character Charlie Spinner in the CBBC television series Oscar Charlie opposite David Swift. Other notable roles are as Albert Sandwich in the BBC film drama Carrie's War, Prince Harry in the television film about Prince William and Sam Warren in parts 1 and 2 of Messiah.

Filmography

External links

 Eddie Cooper Online

1987 births
Living people
Alumni of Nottingham Trent University
Place of birth missing (living people)
British male television actors